Thomas MacFarlane was a New Zealand cricketer. He played four first-class matches for Otago between 1870 and 1874.

See also
 List of Otago representative cricketers

References

Year of birth missing
Year of death missing
New Zealand cricketers
Otago cricketers
Place of birth missing